Match Made in Heaven is a reality dating show.  It features Shawn Bullard, an African-American real estate magnate, looking for a romantic partner.

The show premiered on February 4, 2015.

Cast

Game History

Angelica _ we need to talk sms- out episode 1

Episodes

References

External links

2015 American television seasons